Bellpuig is a town in the comarca (county) of l'Urgell in Catalonia, Spain.

Nowadays Bellpuig is the third most important town in the area of Urgell. The town, located between the three little hills appearing in the flag, is served by Bellpuig railway station.

People 
Bellpuig in 1487 was the birthplace of Ramón de Cardona, Baron of Bellpuig, Count of Alvito and Duke of Somma (in Catalan Ramon Folc III de Cardona-Anglesola). He was a Catalan general of the Holy League troops and viceroy of Naples from 1509 to 1522.
His funeral monument is in Bellpuig, where the body was transported nine years after his death on 10 March 1522.
The monument was designed and built by Giovanni da Nola and Genoese master sculptors, it is one of the most important examples of Renaissance art in Spain.

Events
The Festival of the Verge dels Dolors takes place every year and includes a religious procession. This celebration is more than 300 years old.

Sports
The village has one of the most important Motocross facilities in the south of Europe. The Circuit de Motocros Montperler held many national and international competitions in the past.

Twin towns
 Bormio, Italy

References

External links

 Government data pages 

Municipalities in Urgell
Populated places in Urgell